Afromygale is a small genus of east African mygalomorph spiders in the family Pycnothelidae. It was first described by S. L. Zonstein in 2020.  it contains only two species: A. pinnipalpis and A. rukanga.

See also
 List of Pycnothelidae species

References

Pycnothelidae
Mygalomorphae genera
Spiders of Africa